Salvador de Menezes Drummond Furtado de Mendonça (Itaboraí, July 21, 1841 – Rio de Janeiro, December 5, 1913), known as Salvador de Mendonça, was a Brazilian lawyer, journalist, diplomat and writer. He was one of the founders of the Brazilian Academy of Letters and of the Republican Movement in Brazil.

After being appointed Consul of Brazil in Baltimore in 1875, Mendonça was made the following year consul general of the Brazilian Empire in the United States, with residence in New York City. After serving in that position for 14 years, in 1890 he was appointed minister plenipotentiary of Brazil to the U.S.

References

External links
 

19th-century Brazilian people
Members of the Brazilian Academy of Letters
Portuguese-language writers
Brazilian diplomats
1841 births
1913 deaths